Mount Maburgos a mountain in the Philippines. It is located in the province of Batangas and the Calabarzon region, north-west of the country, 80 km south-west of the national capital Manila.

References

Mountains of the Philippines
Landforms of Batangas